Oleg Dimitrov (Bulgarian: Олег Димитров; born 6 March 1996) is a Bulgarian footballer who plays as a midfielder for Etar Veliko Tarnovo.

Career

Youth career
Born in Kyustendil, Dimitrov started his career in the local team Velbazhd Kystendil. He became one of the first players to join the newly created team FC Buzlodzha Kyustendil, which later merged with Velbazhd Kyustendil. From Buzlodzha Oleg was attracted to the 31 time champions of Bulgaria - CSKA Sofia. He became a champion with the U17 league. In 2012, he moved to the Bulgarian champions Ludogorets Razgrad.

Ludogorets Razgrad
In 2012 Dimitrov joined the youth system of Ludogorets Razgrad. In 2014, he played for Ludogorets U19 in the UEFA Youth League, being a titular in all of the 6 matches.

In 2015 Dimitrov became champion with Ludogorets in the U21 league where he served as a vice-captain of the team. He also scored 3 goals in the league.

From the 2015/16 season Ludogorets got the chance to have second team in B Group and Oleg was promoted to the newly created Ludogorets Razgrad II. He made his debut for the team on 2 August 2015 in a match against Pirin Razlog, losing 1:0.

On 23 September 2015 he made his debut for Ludogorets first team in a match against Lokomotiv 1929 Mezdra for the Bulgarian Cup won by Ludogorets by 5:0. He completed his debut for the club in A Group on 27 May 2016 in a match against Botev Plovdiv.

Dimitrov started the 2017-18 season in Ludogorets II playing in the first match of the season against Lokomotiv 1929 Sofia.

International career

Youth levels
Dimitrov was called up for Bulgaria U21 for a training game against the main national team on 22 February 2017. He made unofficial debut for the team commimg as a substitute in the 1:1 draw. Dimitrov made his official debut on 28 March 2017 in a friendly match against Macedonia U21.

Statistics

Club

Honours
Ludogorets
 A PFG: 2015–16

References

External links
 
 

1996 births
Living people
Bulgarian footballers
Bulgaria under-21 international footballers
Bulgaria youth international footballers
First Professional Football League (Bulgaria) players
Second Professional Football League (Bulgaria) players
PFC Ludogorets Razgrad II players
PFC Ludogorets Razgrad players
PFC Litex Lovech players
SFC Etar Veliko Tarnovo players
Association football midfielders
People from Kyustendil
Sportspeople from Kyustendil Province